The Indian Institute of Management Tiruchirappalli (also known as IIM Trichy) is an autonomous public business school located in Tiruchirappalli, Tamilnadu in India. The eleventh IIM, it was instituted on 4 January 2011. It has been ranked 15th among management schools by NIRF. It operates from its campus spread over 175 acres of land, about 11 km from Tiruchirappalli International Airport. It also has a satellite campus in Chennai for executive education. It offers full-time, executive and doctoral programs in business management.

Campus
The campus of Indian Institute of Management Tiruchirappalli is located on a  land on the Tiruchirappalli-Pudukkottai highway. The  state-of-the-art campus consists of student hostels, faculty residences, a library, recreational facilities and Executive Residences.

IIM Tiruchirappalli set up a satellite campus at Chennai in the year 2012. It offers a two-year postgraduate programme for working professionals from this campus.

Academics

Academic programs
IIM Trichy offers a two-year full-time residential Post Graduate Programme in Management (PGPM), a two-year Post Graduate Programme in Business Management (PGPBM) for working executives at Chennai campus, and a Fellow Programme in Management (FPM) for Doctor of Business Administration candidates. In the year 2020, IIM Trichy launched a Post Graduate Programme in Human Resources Management (PGPM-HR) at its Trichy campus.

Admission Process 
The admission for the two-year full-time residential Post Graduate Programme in Management (PGP) and Post Graduate Programme in Human Resources Management (PGPM-HR) is through the Common Admission Test (CAT) scores followed by the Common Admission Process (CAP), where the 10 new and baby IIMs take part. The CAP consists of a written-ability test (WAT) followed by an interview. Based on the past academic performances, work experience, CAT scores and CAP scores, students are offered admission into this programs. The total intake for the following batch 2021-23 was 230 students for pgpm and 30 for pgpm-hr.

Rankings

IIM Tiruchirappalli was ranked 15 in National Institutional Ranking Framework (NIRF) management school ranking of 2020.

Student life

Cultural events 
IIMT hosts several yearly events. Dhruva is a cultural and management fest held in the second half of the month of October. E-Summit is an entrepreneurial summit held in the month of November. HR Conclave is an industry-academia interaction event focused on Human Resources. Other events include Sanskriti - an annual war of sections, Sangram - an inter-IIM sports meet, and Kurukshetra - an inter-section sports tournament.

References

External links
 Official website

TRICHY
Business schools in Tamil Nadu
IIM
Educational institutions established in 2011
2011 establishments in Tamil Nadu